Mate burilado are calabash or gourd fruit decorated by hand with a technique called burilado using the carving instrument called  or burin. This Peruvian folk art form is found in the Mantaro Valley, as well as in the provinces of Lambayeque and Huanta. For more than 4,000 years, artisans have practiced the tradition of hand-carving dried gourds to document oral narratives. Commonly, the training process takes five years.

Notable people
 Irma Poma Canchumani (born 1969), Peruvian mate burilado artist and environmental defender

References

Peruvian art
Folk art
Indigenous art of the Americas